Agnete Nielsen (born 15 April 1999) is a Danish professional football player who plays as a midfielder for Vålerenga in Norway top-division Toppserien and the Denmark's under-23 national team.

Career
Nielsen scored on her debut for Fortuna Hjørring, where she won the Danish Championship twice in 2018 and 2020. She later transferred to Brøndby, where she played regularly for the first team.

She has played for several of Denmark's youth national teams and is part of Denmark's U/23 national team.

Honours

Club
Fortuna Hjørring
Champion
 Elitedivisionen: 2017-18, 2019–20
 Danish Women's Cup: 2019

References

External links
 
 

1999 births
Living people
Danish women's footballers
Denmark women's international footballers
Fortuna Hjørring players
Brøndby IF (women) players
Women's association football forwards
Ballerup-Skovlunde Fodbold (women) players
Association football forwards
Association football midfielders
Women's association football midfielders